The 2015–16 Miami Heat season was the 28th season of the franchise in the National Basketball Association (NBA).

During the season, the Heat dealt fan favorites and recent champions Mario Chalmers and Chris Andersen to the Memphis Grizzlies and picked up seven-time All-Star Joe Johnson after Johnson and the Brooklyn Nets agreed to a buyout-waiver near the end of the regular season. They also shot a franchise-high FG% of 67.5% in a game versus the Chicago Bulls on March 1. Center Hassan Whiteside would also lead the NBA in blocks this season. The Heat ended the year as the 3rd seed in the east and as the Southeast Division champions for the 12th time in franchise history, with both the overall playoff spot and division title coming after a disappointing, lottery-bound 2014–15 season in the aftermath of LeBron James returning to the Cleveland Cavaliers as a free agent, thus defeating the Charlotte Hornets in the first round of the playoffs. The Heat finished their 2015–16 run in a Game 7 (89-116) loss against the Toronto Raptors in the Conference Semifinals.

After 13 years, it marked the end of the Dwyane Wade era as he signed with his hometown team, the Chicago Bulls. However, he later returned to the team at the trade deadline of the 2017-18 season.

Chris Bosh played his final home game versus the San Antonio Spurs on February 9, 2016, as he would sit out the next season due to blood clotting issues and would be waived by the Heat in July 2017. Despite rumors of a possible return to the league to play for the Toronto Raptors, Golden State Warriors, or Houston Rockets, Bosh formally announced his retirement from the NBA after 14 years, on February 12, 2019 and a month later, the Heat retired his No. 1 jersey.

Draft picks

Roster

Standings

Preseason

|- style="background:#fbb;"
| 1
| October 4
| Charlotte
| 77–90
| Chris Bosh (14)
| Chris Bosh (7)
| Goran Dragić (6)
| American Airlines Arena19,600
| 0–1
|- style="background:#fbb;"
| 2
| October 7
| Orlando
| 97–100
| Chris Bosh (18)
| Luol Deng (6)
| Dwyane Wade (6)
| KFC Yum! Center6,123
| 0–2
|- style="background:#bfb;"
| 3
| October 12
| San Antonio
| 97–94
| Gerald Green (17)
| Andersen, Bosh, Winslow (7)
| Goran Dragić (3)
| American Airlines Arena19,600
| 1–2
|- style="background:#fbb;"
| 4
| October 13
| @ Orlando
| 92–95 OT
| Josh Richardson (18)
| Greg Whittington (12)
| Tre Kelley (7)
| Amway Center16,105
| 1–3
|- style="background:#bfb;"
| 5
| October 17
| @ Houston
| 105–100
| Gerald Green (21)
| Hassan Whiteside (9)
| Justise Winslow (8)
| Toyota Center18,334
| 2–3
|- style="background:#bfb;"
| 6
| October 18
| @ Atlanta
| 101–92
| Ennis, Green (19)
| Andersen, Benson (7)
| Mario Chalmers (7)
| Philips Arena13,038
| 3–3
|- style="background:#bfb;"
| 7
| October 21
| Washington
| 110–105
| Gerald Green (28)
| Gerald Green (9)
| Dwyane Wade (6)
| American Airlines Arena19,600
| 4–3
|- style="background:#fbb;"
| 8
| October 23
| @ New Orleans
| 90–93
| Gerald Green (24)
| Hassan Whiteside (12)
| Josh McRoberts (6)
| Smoothie King Center16,478
| 4–4

Regular season game log

|- style="background:#bfb;"
| 1
| October 28
| Charlotte
| 
| Chris Bosh (21)
| Chris Bosh (10)
| Goran Dragić (6)
| American Airlines Arena19,724
| 1–0
|-style="background:#fbb;"
| 2
| October 30
| @ Cleveland
| 
| Dwyane Wade (25)
| Hassan Whiteside (8)
| Goran Dragić (6)
| Quicken Loans Arena20,562
| 1–1

|- style="background:#bfb;"
| 3
| November 1
| Houston
| 
| Hassan Whiteside (25)
| Hassan Whiteside (15)
| Dwyane Wade (8)
| American Airlines Arena19,600
| 2–1
|- style="background:#fbb;"
| 4
| November 3
| Atlanta
| 
| Hassan Whiteside (23)
| Bosh, Whiteside (14)
| Chalmers, Wade (3)
| American Airlines Arena19,600
| 2–2
|-style="background:#bfb;"
| 5
| November 5
| @ Minnesota
| 
| Dwyane Wade (25)
| Chris Bosh (12)
| Tyler Johnson (3)
| Target Center11,794
| 3–2
|-style="background:#fbb;"
| 6
| November 6
| @ Indiana
| 
| Chris Bosh (21)
| Hassan Whiteside (12)
| Dwyane Wade (6)
| Bankers Life Fieldhouse16,914
| 3–3
|- style="background:#bfb;"
| 7
| November 8
| Toronto
| 
| Chris Bosh (23)
| Hassan Whiteside (11)
| Mario Chalmers (8)
| American Airlines Arena19,600
| 4–3
|- style="background:#bfb;"
| 8
| November 10
| L.A. Lakers
| 
| Chris Bosh (30)
| Hassan Whiteside (15)
| Dwyane Wade (6)
| American Airlines Arena19,825
| 5–3
|- style="background:#bfb;"
| 9
| November 12
| Utah
| 
| Chris Bosh (25)
| Hassan Whiteside (15)
| Bosh, Dragić (4)
| American Airlines Arena19,600
| 6–3
|- style="background:#fbb;"
| 10
| November 17
| Minnesota
| 
| Hassan Whiteside (22)
| Hassan Whiteside (14)
| Goran Dragić (9)
| American Airlines Arena19,600
| 6–4
|- style="background:#bfb;"
| 11
| November 19
| Sacramento
| 
| Dwyane Wade (24)
| Chris Bosh (12)
| Dragić, Wade (6)
| American Airlines Arena19,600
| 7–4
|- style="background:#bfb;"
| 12
| November 21
| Philadelphia
| 
| Dwyane Wade (27)
| Chris Bosh (11)
| Deng, Dragić, Wade (4)
| American Airlines Arena19,673
| 8–4
|- style="background:#bfb;"
| 13
| November 23
| New York
| 
| Wade, Bosh (16)
| Hassan Whiteside (11)
| Dragić, Wade (5)
| American Airlines Arena19,777
| 9–4
|- style="background:#fbb;"
| 14
| November 25
| @ Detroit
| 
| Gerald Green (16)
| Hassan Whiteside (13)
| Bosh, Dragić, Udrih (4)
| The Palace of Auburn Hills15,119
| 9–5
|- style="background:#bfb;"
| 15
| November 27
| @ New York
| 
| Gerald Green (25)
| Hassan Whiteside (14)
| Bosh, Dragić, McRoberts, Wade (3)
| Madison Square Garden19,812
| 10–5
|- style="background:#fbb;"
| 16
| November 30
| Boston
| 
| Dwyane Wade (30)
| Chris Bosh (10)
| Chris Bosh (5)
| American Airlines Arena19,600
| 10–6
|-

|- style="background:#bfb;"
| 17
| December 3
| Oklahoma City
| 
| Dwyane Wade (28)
| Bosh, Whiteside (8)
| Goran Dragić (7)
| American Airlines Arena19,600
| 11–6
|- style="background:#bfb;"
| 18
| December 5
| Cleveland
| 
| Johnson, Wade (19)
| Hassan Whiteside (9)
| Goran Dragić (8)
| American Airlines Arena19,600
| 12–6
|- style="background:#fbb;"
| 19
| December 7
| Washington
| 
| Dwyane Wade (26)
| Chris Bosh (9)
| Dragić, Wade (9)
| American Airlines Arena19,600
| 12–7
|- style="background:#fbb;"
| 20
| December 9
| @ Charlotte
| 
| Tyler Johnson (20)
| Winslow, Whiteside (8)
| Dwyane Wade (4)
| Time Warner Cable Arena17,404
| 12–8
|- style="background:#fbb;"
| 21
| December 11
| @ Indiana
| 
| Chris Bosh (23)
| Bosh, Whiteside (10)
| Goran Dragic (7)
| Bankers Life Fieldhouse18,165
| 12–9
|- style="background:#bfb;"
| 22
| December 13
| Memphis
| 
| Chris Bosh (22)
| Hassan Whiteside (11)
| Goran Dragic (8)
| American Airlines Arena19,813
| 13–9
|- style="background:#bfb;"
| 23
| December 14
| @ Atlanta
| 
| Chris Bosh (24)
| Hassan Whiteside (13)
| Goran Dragic (8)
| Philips Arena15,039
| 14–9
|- style="background:#bfb;"
| 24
| December 16
| @ Brooklyn
| 
| Dwyane Wade (28)
| Hassan Whiteside (13)
| Goran Dragic (5)
| Barclays Center15,113
| 15–9
|- style="background:#fbb;"
| 25
| December 18
| Toronto
| 
| Dwyane Wade (21)
| Hassan Whiteside (13)
| Dragic, Wade (5)
| American Airlines Arena19,600
| 15–10
|- style="background:#bfb;"
| 26
| December 20
| Portland
| 
| Chris Bosh (29)
| Hassan Whiteside (11)
| Goran Dragic (8)
| American Airlines Arena19,600
| 16–10
|- style="background:#fbb;"
| 27
| December 22
| Detroit
| 
| Chris Bosh (20)
| Hassan Whiteside (16)
| Beno Udrih (6)
| American Airlines Arena19,901
| 16–11
|- style="background:#bfb;"
| 28
| December 25
| New Orleans
| 
| Chris Bosh (30)
| Hassan Whiteside (17)
| Goran Dragic (6)
| American Airlines Arena19,845
| 17–11
|- style="background:#bfb;"
| 29
| December 26
| @ Orlando
| 
| Bosh, Wade (24)
| Chris Bosh (10)
| Dwyane Wade (6)
| Amway Center18,846
| 18–11
|- style="background:#fbb;"
| 30
| December 28
| Brooklyn
| 
| Chris Bosh (24)
| Chris Bosh (12)
| Dwyane Wade (6)
| American Airlines Arena19,975
| 18–12
|- style="background:#fbb;"
| 31
| December 29
| @ Memphis
| 
| Dwyane Wade (19)
| Hassan Whiteside (11)
| Dragic, Wade (5)
| FedEx Forum18,119
| 18–13

|- style="background:#bfb;"
| 32
| January 1
| Dallas
| 
| Hassan Whiteside (25)
| Hassan Whiteside (19)
| Dragic, Wade (7)
| American Airlines Arena19,748
| 19–13
|- style="background:#bfb;"
| 33
| January 3
| @ Washington
| 
| Chris Bosh (23)
| Hassan Whiteside (13)
| Beno Udrih (6)
| Verizon Center17,793
| 20–13
|-style="background:#bfb;"
| 34
| January 4
| Indiana
| 
| Chris Bosh (31)
| Chris Bosh (11)
| Goran Dragic (4)
| American Airlines Arena19,874
| 21–13
|-style="background:#fbb;"
| 35
| January 6
| New York
| 
| Chris Bosh (28)
| Hassan Whiteside (6)
| Dwyane Wade (6)
| AmericanAirlines Arena19,987
| 21–14
|- style="background:#bfb;"
| 36
| January 8
| @ Phoenix
| 
| Dwyane Wade (27)
| Justise Winslow (10)
| Goran Dragic (7)
| Talking Stick Resort Arena16,866
| 22–14
|- style="background:#fbb;"
| 37
| January 9
| @ Utah
| 
| Chris Bosh (24)
| Hassan Whiteside (11)
| Udrih, Wade (4)
| Vivint Smart Home Arena19,911
| 22–15
|- style="background:#fbb;"
| 38
| January 11
| @ Golden State
| 
| Dwyane Wade (20)
| Chris Bosh (12)
| Dwyane Wade (11)
| Oracle Arena19,596
| 22–16
|- style="background:#fbb;"
| 39
| January 13
| @ L. A. Clippers
| 
| Gerald Green (19)
| Chris Bosh (12)
| Chris Bosh (7)
| STAPLES Center19,194
| 22–17
|- style="background:#bfb;"
| 40
| January 15
| @ Denver
| 
| Chris Bosh (24)
| Hassan Whiteside (17)
| Beno Udrih (11)
| Pepsi Center15,406
| 23–17
|- style="background:#fbb;"
| 41
| January 17
| @ Oklahoma City
| 
| Dwyane Wade (22)
| Hassan Whiteside (11)
| Tyler Johnson (4)
| Chesapeake Energy Arena18,203
| 23–18
|- style="background:#fbb;"
| 42
| January 19
| Milwaukee
| 
| Bosh, Whiteside (23)
| Hassan Whiteside (18)
| Dwyane Wade (4)
| American Airlines Arena19,886
| 23–19
|- style="background:#fbb;"
| 43
| January 20
| @ Washington
| 
| Chris Bosh (18)
| Luol Deng (8)
| Justise Winslow (6)
| Verizon Center17,008
| 23–20
|-style="background:#fbb;"
| 44
| January 22
| @ Toronto
| 
| Chris Bosh (26)
| Udonis Haslem (9)
| Richardson, Wade (4)
| Air Canada Centre19,800
| 23–21
|-style="background:#bfb;"
| 45
| January 25
| @ Chicago
| 
| Dwyane Wade (28)
| Amar'e Stoudemire (10)
| Dwyane Wade (5)
| United Center21,720
| 24–21
|-style="background:#bfb;"
| 46
| January 26
| @ Brooklyn
| 
| Dwyane Wade (27)
| Stoudemire, Winslow (7)
| Dwyane Wade (8) 
| Barclays Center15,267
| 25–21
|-style="background:#bfb;"
| 47
| January 29
| @ Milwaukee
| 
| Dwyane Wade (24)
| Amar'e Stoudemire (8)
| Goran Dragic (8)
| BMO Harris Bradley Center17,846
| 26–21
|-style="background:#bfb;"
| 48
| January 31
| Atlanta
| 
| Deng, Dwyane Wade (17)
| Amar'e Stoudemire (12)
| Dwyane Wade (8)
| American Airlines Arena19,937
| 27–21

|- style="background:#fbb;"
| 49
| February 2
| @ Houston
| 
| Luol Deng (17)
| Amar'e Stoudemire (10)
| Goran Dragic (6)
| Toyota Center18,229
| 27–22
|- style="background:#bfb;"
| 50
| February 3
| @ Dallas
| 
| Chris Bosh (20)
| Hassan Whiteside (9)
| Goran Dragic (7)
| American Airlines Center20,385
| 28–22
|- style="background:#bfb;"
| 51
| February 5
| @ Charlotte
| 
| Dwyane Wade (22)
| Whiteside, Winslow (10)
| Goran Dragic (9)
| Time Warner Cable Arena19,147
| 29–22
|- style="background:#fbb;"
| 52
| February 7
| L. A. Clippers
| 
| Bosh, Dragic, Wade (17)
| Whiteside, Winslow (10)
| Goran Dragic (5)
| American Airlines Arena19,624
| 29–23
|- style="background:#fbb;"
| 53
| February 9
| San Antonio
| 
| Dwyane Wade (20)
| Amar'e Stoudemire (8)
| Goran Dragic (6)
| American Airlines Arena19,723
| 29–24
|- align="center"
|colspan="9" bgcolor="#bbcaff"|All-Star Break
|- style="background:#bfb;"
| 54
| February 19
| @ Atlanta
| 
| Luol Deng (30)
| Luol Deng (11)
| Goran Dragic (12)
| Philips Arena19,043
| 30–24
|- style="background:#bfb;"
| 55
| February 20
| Washington
| 
| Luol Deng (27)
| Hassan Whiteside (23)
| Goran Dragic (8)
| American Airlines Arena19,710
| 31–24
|- style="background:#bfb;"
| 56
| February 22
| Indiana
| 
| Goran Dragic (24)
| Luol Deng (16)
| Goran Dragic (5)
| American Airlines Arena19,600
| 32–24
|- style="background:#fbb;"
| 57
| February 24
| Golden State
| 
| Dwyane Wade (32)
| Hassan Whiteside (13)
| Dragic, Wade (7)
| American Airlines Arena19,899
| 32–25
|- style="background:#fbb;"
| 58
| February 27
| @ Boston
| 
| Goran Dragic (21)
| Deng, Whiteside (12)
| Goran Dragic (5)
| TD Garden18,624
| 32–26
|- style="background:#bfb;"
| 59
| February 28
| @ New York
| 
| Dwyane Wade (26)
| Justise Winslow (13)
| Dragic, Wade (6)
| Madison Square Garden19,812
| 33–26

|- style="background:#bfb;"
| 60
| March 1
| Chicago
| 
| Hassan Whiteside (26)
| Hassan Whiteside (14)
| Goran Dragic (11)
| American Airlines Arena19,654
| 34–26
|- style="background:#bfb;"
| 61
| March 3
| Phoenix
| 
| Dwyane Wade (27)
| Hassan Whiteside (11)
| Dwyane Wade (7)
| American Airlines Arena19,600
| 35–26
|- style="background:#bfb;"
| 62
| March 4
| @ Philadelphia
| 
| Dwyane Wade (21)
| Hassan Whiteside (19)
| Goran Dragic (11)
| Wells Fargo Center17,610
| 36–26
|- style="background:#bfb;"
| 63
| March 6
| Philadelphia
| 
| Dragic, Wade (23)
| Luol Deng (14)
| Goran Dragic (5)
| American Airlines Arena19,820
| 37–26
|- style="background:#fbb;"
| 64
| March 9
| @ Milwaukee
| 
| Hassan Whiteside (23)
| Hassan Whiteside (13)
| Dragic, Wade (6)
| BMO Harris Bradley Center15,005
| 37–27
|-style="background:#bfb;"
| 65
| March 11
| @ Chicago
| 
| Goran Dragic (26)
| Hassan Whiteside (16)
| Goran Dragic (9)
| United Center22,067
| 38–27
|-style="background:#fbb;"
| 66
| March 12
| @ Toronto
| 
| Joe Johnson (28)
| Hassan Whiteside (11)
| Goran Dragic (9)
| Air Canada Centre19,800
| 38–28
|-style="background:#bfb;"
| 67
| March 14
| Denver
| 
| Justise Winslow (20)
| Hassan Whiteside (10)
| Goran Dragic (8)
| American Airlines Arena19,744
| 39–28
|-style="background:#fbb;"
| 68
| March 17
| Charlotte
| 
| Luol Deng (22)
| Luol Deng (9)
| Goran Dragic (8)
| American Airlines Arena19,848
| 39–29
|-style="background:#bfb;"
| 69
| March 19
| Cleveland
| 
| Dwyane Wade (24)
| Hassan Whiteside (13)
| Goran Dragic (11)
| American Airlines Arena19,737
| 40–29
|-style="background:#bfb;"
| 70
| March 22
| @ New Orleans
| 
| Hassan Whiteside (24)
| Hassan Whiteside (14)
| Goran Dragic (5)
| Smoothie King Center16,867
| 41–29
|-style="background:#fbb;"
| 71
| March 23
| @ San Antonio
| 
| Josh Richardson (17)
| Hassan Whiteside (14)
| Joe Johnson (5)
| AT&T Center18,418
| 41–30
|-style="background:#bfb;"
| 72
| March 25
| Orlando
| 
| Hassan Whiteside (26)
| Luol Deng (13)
| Goran Dragic (8)
| American Airlines Arena19,918
| 42–30
|-style="background:#bfb;"
| 73
| March 28
| Brooklyn
| 
| Dwyane Wade (30)
| Hassan Whiteside (8)
| Dwyane Wade (9)
| American Airlines Arena20,003
| 43–30
|- style="background:#fbb;"
| 74
| March 30
| @ L. A. Lakers
| 
| Dwyane Wade (26)
| Hassan Whiteside (17)
| Goran Dragic (9)
| Staples Center18,997
| 43–31

|- style="background:#bfb;"
| 75
| April 1
| @ Sacramento
| 
| Gerald Green (30)
| Hassan Whiteside (13)
| Joe Johnson (8)
| Sleep Train Arena17,317
| 44–31
|- style="background:#fbb;"
| 76
| April 2
| @ Portland
| 
| Hassan Whiteside (20)
| Deng, Whiteside (13)
| Josh Richardson (4)
| Moda Center19,633
| 44–32
|-style="background:#bfb;"
| 77
| April 5
| Detroit
| 
| Goran Dragic (22)
| Hassan Whiteside (12)
| Goran Dragic (8)
| American Airlines Arena19,621
| 45–32
|-style="background:#bfb;"
| 78
| April 7
| Chicago
| 
| Dwyane Wade (21)
| Dragic, Whiteside (12)
| Dragic, Johnson, Wade (4)
| American Airlines Arena19,771
| 46–32
|- style="background:#fbb;"
| 79
| April 8
| @ Orlando
| 
| Dwyane Wade (17)
| Hassan Whiteside (16)
| Goran Dragic (6)
| Amway Center18,152
| 46–33
|-style="background:#bfb;"
| 80
| April 10
| Orlando
| 
| Luol Deng (20)
| Hassan Whiteside (15)
| Goran Dragic (6)
| American Airlines Arena19,913
| 47–33
|- style="background:#bfb;"
| 81
| April 12
| @ Detroit
| 
| Joe Johnson (25)
| Luol Deng (10)
| Joe Johnson (5)
| The Palace of Auburn Hills18,575
| 48–33
|- style="background:#fbb;"
| 82
| April 13
| @ Boston
| 
| Joe Johnson (19)
| Justise Winslow (10)
| Dwyane Wade (5)
| TD Garden18,624
| 48–34

Statistics

 Stats did not include traded players
 Stats Date December 21

Playoffs

Game log

|- style="background:#bfb;"
| 1
| April 17
| Charlotte
| 
| Luol Deng (31)
| Hassan Whiteside (11)
| Goran Dragić (10)
| American Airlines Arena19,600
| 1–0
|- style="background:#bfb;"
| 2
| April 20
| Charlotte
| 
| Dwyane Wade (26)
| Hassan Whiteside (13)
| Dwyane Wade (8)
| American Airlines Arena19,650
| 2–0
|- style="background:#fbb;"
| 3
| April 23
| @ Charlotte
| 
| Luol Deng (19)
| Hassan Whiteside (18)
| Goran Dragić (4)
| Time Warner Cable Arena19,604
| 2–1
|- style="background:#fbb;"
| 4
| April 25
| @ Charlotte
| 
| Joe Johnson (16)
| Four players (7)
| Dwyane Wade (10)
| Time Warner Cable Arena19,156
| 2–2
|- style="background:#fbb;"
| 5
| April 27
| Charlotte
| 
| Dwyane Wade (25)
| Hassan Whiteside (12)
| Dwyane Wade (4)
| American Airlines Arena19,685
| 2–3
|- style="background:#bfb;"
| 6
| April 29
| @ Charlotte
| 
| Dwyane Wade (23)
| Whiteside, Dragić, Haslem (7)
| Dwyane Wade (4)
| Time Warner Cable Arena19,636
| 3–3
|- style="background:#bfb;"
| 7
| May 1
| Charlotte
| 
| Goran Dragić (25)
| Hassan Whiteside (12)
| Dragić, Johnson, Deng (4)
| American Airlines Arena19,685
| 4–3

|- style="background:#bfb;"
| 1
| May 3
| @ Toronto
| 
| Goran Dragić (26)
| Hassan Whiteside (17)
| Dwyane Wade (4)
| Air Canada Centre19,800
| 1–0
|- style="background:#fbb;"
| 2
| May 5
| @ Toronto
| 
| Goran Dragić (20)
| Hassan Whiteside (13)
| Joe Johnson (4)
| Air Canada Centre20,906
| 1–1
|- style="background:#fbb;"
| 3
| May 7
| Toronto
| 
| Dwyane Wade (38)
| Dwyane Wade (8)
| Dwyane Wade (4)
| American Airlines Arena19,675
| 1–2
|- style="background:#bfb;"
| 4
| May 9
| Toronto
| 
| Dwyane Wade (30)
| Luol Deng (9)
| Goran Dragić (4)
| American Airlines Arena19,600
| 2–2
|- style="background:#fbb;"
| 5
| May 11
| @ Toronto
| 
| Dwyane Wade (20)
| Joe Johnson (8)
| Johnson, Wade (4)
| Air Canada Centre20,155
| 2–3
|- style="background:#bfb;"
| 6
| May 13
| Toronto
| 
| Goran Dragić (30)
| Goran Dragić (7)
| Dwyane Wade (5)
| American Airlines Arena15,797
| 3–3
|- style="background:#fbb;"
| 7
| May 15
| @ Toronto
| 
| Wade, Dragić (16)
| Justise Winslow (8)
| Goran Dragić (7)
| Air Canada Centre20,257
| 3–4

Transactions

Trades

Free agents

Re-signed

Additions

Subtractions

References

Miami Heat seasons
Miami Heat
Miami Heat
Miami Heat